William R. Thomas was a former football (soccer) player who represented New Zealand at international level.

Thomas made his full All Whites debut in a 3–2 win over Australia on 16 June 1923 and was again on the winning side as New Zealand beat their trans-Tasman rivals 4–1 on 30 June 1923. They were to be his only two official internationals for New Zealand.

References

New Zealand association footballers
New Zealand international footballers
20th-century New Zealand people
Year of birth missing
Year of death missing
Association footballers not categorized by position